Yu Lamei (born January 15, 1983 in Jiaoliudao subdistrict, Wafangdian, Liaoning) is a Chinese sprint canoer who has competed since the late 2000s. She won two medals in the K-4 1000 m event at the ICF Canoe Sprint World Championships with a silver in 2007 and a bronze in 2006.

Yu also finished ninth in the K-4 500 m event at the 2008 Summer Olympics in Beijing.

References

Sports-reference.com profile
Team China 2008 profile

1983 births
Living people
Sportspeople from Dalian
Canoeists from Liaoning
Olympic canoeists of China
Canoeists at the 2008 Summer Olympics
Canoeists at the 2012 Summer Olympics
Asian Games medalists in canoeing
ICF Canoe Sprint World Championships medalists in kayak
Canoeists at the 2006 Asian Games
Canoeists at the 2010 Asian Games
Chinese female canoeists
Medalists at the 2006 Asian Games
Medalists at the 2010 Asian Games
Asian Games gold medalists for China